Justice Boyd may refer to:

Andrew Hunter Boyd (1849–1935), chief judge of the Maryland Court of Appeals.
Jeffrey S. Boyd (born 1961), associate justice of the Texas Supreme Court
Joseph A. Boyd Jr. (1916–2007), associate justice and chief justice of the Florida Supreme Court

See also
Boyd Leedom, associate justice of the South Dakota Supreme Court
Judge Boyd (disambiguation)